Shannon Evans II (born July 19, 1994) whose nickname is Shannito Evans is an American-Guinean basketball player for Valencia of the Spanish Liga ACB and the EuroLeague. He competed in college for Buffalo and Arizona State.

Early life and high school career
Evans is the son of Shannon and Armona Evans. He was a multi-sport athlete growing up, playing cornerback and receiver in football as well as playing center field in baseball, though basketball remained his favorite. At Nansemond River High School, Evans was coached by Ed Young, and the two had a contentious relationship. He joined the varsity team as a sophomore but Young sent him down to junior varsity since he did not think Evans was ready. As a junior, Evans started the season as a bench player but joined the starting lineup after scoring 27 points in his first start. He received some college looks after his senior season, but his SAT scores did not qualify him for a college scholarship, so he opted for a postgraduate year at prep school Hargrave Military Academy. His parents, grandparents, and great-aunt helped him pay for tuition, with his mother cashing out her 401(k) account. Evans received scholarship offers before his first game and committed to Buffalo.

College career
At Buffalo, Evans averaged 8.5 points per game. He averaged 15.4 points, 3.2 rebounds, and 4.6 assists per game as a sophomore, shooting 38 percent from the three-point line, and led the Bulls to their first NCAA Tournament. Evans was named to the Second-team All-MAC. After his sophomore season, Buffalo coach Bobby Hurley was hired at Arizona State, and Evans decided to follow him despite his mother's objections. As a junior, Evans was second to Tra Holder on the team with 15.0 points per game and was fifth in the conference in assists with 4.4 a game.

Evans began his senior season well, scoring 22 points in a win over Xavier on November 24, 2017. Evans scored 22 points in a win against Kansas two weeks later and was named Oscar Robertson National Player of the Week. Evans's shooting then fell off, and he missed 15 consecutive 3-point attempts at one point. He averaged 16.5 points, 3.3 rebounds and 3.5 assists per game and led Arizona State to the NCAA Tournament. As a senior, Evans was named Honorable Mention All-Pac-12.

Professional career

Atomerőmű SE (2018–2020)
After going undrafted in the 2018 NBA draft, Evans played for the Houston Rockets in the NBA Summer League. In August 2018, he signed with Atomerőmű SE of the Hungarian league. On November 22, 2018, Evans scored 24 points, 4 rebounds, 4 assists, 4 steals, and 1 block in a victory against Pecsi VSK-Veolia. In his first year, Evans appeared in thirteen games for Atomerőmű SE and averaged 15.9 points, 2.7 rebounds, and 4.2 assists. On November 1, 2019, Evans scored 29 points, 5 rebounds, 4 assists, and 3 steals in a victory against Zalakerámia ZTE. In his final year, Evans appeared in twenty games for Atomerőmű SE averaged 18 points, 3.7 rebounds, and 6.9 assists.

Pau-Orthez (2020)
On June 23, 2020, Evans signed with Pau-Orthez of the French LNB Pro A. On November 5, he was named player of the week after posting 27 points and 11 assists in a 90–81 victory over Le Mans Sarthe Basket. Evans appeared in five games for Pau-Orthez and averaged 21.8 points, 2.8 rebounds and 8.4 assists.

Bahçeşehir Koleji (2020–2021)
On November 26, 2020, he signed with Bahçeşehir Koleji of the Turkish Basketball Super League (BSL). On January 1, 2021, Evans scored 20 points, 2 rebounds, 7 assists, and 1 steal in a loss against Tofaş Bursa. Evans appeared in eighteen games for Bahçeşehir Koleji and averaged 11 points, 2.1 rebounds and 4.2 assists.

Coosur Real Betis (2021–2023)
On August 4, 2021, Evans signed with Real Betis Baloncesto of the Liga ACB.

Valencia Basket (2023–present)
On January 18, 2023, he signed with Valencia of the Spanish Liga ACB.

References

External links
Arizona State Sun Devils bio

1994 births
Living people
African-American basketball players
American expatriate basketball people in Hungary
American expatriate basketball people in France
American expatriate basketball people in Spain
American expatriate basketball people in Turkey
American men's basketball players
Arizona State Sun Devils men's basketball players
Atomerőmű SE players
Bahçeşehir Koleji S.K. players
Basketball players from Virginia
Buffalo Bulls men's basketball players
Élan Béarnais players
Guinean men's basketball players
Hargrave Military Academy alumni
Liga ACB players
Point guards
Real Betis Baloncesto players
Sportspeople from Suffolk, Virginia